The Faroese Løgting had 32 members between the elections of 1990 and 1994.

Members

References 
«Løgtingið 150 – Hátíðarrit», bind 2. Tórshavn 2002. (PDF)

 1990
1990 in the Faroe Islands
1991 in the Faroe Islands
1992 in the Faroe Islands
1993 in the Faroe Islands
1994 in the Faroe Islands
1990–1994